Harry L. Trout was an American politician. He served as the 25th mayor of Lancaster, Pennsylvania from 1915 to 1920.

References

Mayors of Lancaster, Pennsylvania